Michael Caridia (born 2 August 1941) is a British former child actor.

His prominent roles include Sir Reginald, an obnoxious boy, in the Norman Wisdom vehicle Up in the World and Hugo Wendt in the 1956 horror-comedy The Gamma People. In a 1960 dramatisation of the trial of Oscar Wilde he played Edward Shelley, an alleged rent boy who acted as a prosecution witness. He has not had any film or TV appearances since 1961. In 1970 he married Jennifer North in Maidenhead, Berkshire, England.

Filmography
Pieces of Eight, 1956 BBC TV children's film, aged 11. "The Reluctant Bride" 1955 Played 'Tony' as a child actor.

References

External links 

1941 births
Living people
English male film actors
English male child actors
People from Swaffham